Streptomyces caespitosus is a species of actinobacteria. It produces chemotherapeutic drug mitomycin C.

References 

caespitosus